"Love Shine a Light" is a song by British rock band Katrina and the Waves. It represented the United Kingdom at the Eurovision Song Contest in 1997. It was released as a single on 28 April 1997 and was later included on the band's ninth studio album, Walk on Water (1997), serving as the album's lead single.

"Love Shine a Light" won the Eurovision Song Contest in 1997 in Dublin, Ireland. It marked the first time that the UK had won the contest in 16 years, following their win in 1981. The song was the highest-scoring UK entry at that time before being overtaken by Sam Ryder with "Space Man" in 2022. It remains the UK's only win in the contest since 1997.

The song was the group's biggest success since their 1985 hit "Walking on Sunshine". It peaked within the top five of the charts in Austria, Ireland, Norway, the Netherlands, Sweden, and the United Kingdom. In 2022, it was named the best UK Eurovision entry by The Daily Telegraph.

Composition/Great British Song Contest
The song was composed by the group's guitarist and regular songwriter Kimberley Rew following a request from the brother of the group's drummer Alex Cooper for an anthem for Samaritans in recognition of the thirtieth anniversary of the Swindon branch of that organization – Cooper's brother being a member of that branch. In a 1997 interview Katrina and the Waves lead vocalist Katrina Leskanich indicated that it was members of the Samaritans who opined that "Love Shine a Light" "was the type of song which would win the Eurovision Song Contest and [so] at the last minute, [Katrina and the Waves] submitted the song with our £250 [entrance fee]" for consideration to vie in the Great British Song Contest, the national preselection round for the UK in Eurovision 1997.

It was also reported that Carmina Cooper, the manager of Katrina and the Waves and the wife of Alex Cooper, met up with BBC Radio Cambridgeshire's breakfast presenter (and Head of Music) Dan Chisholm to play the track for him: Chisholm's response was to urge that the number be entered in the Great British Song Contest, and after affording "Love Shine a Light" its radio airplay debut Chisholm declared it "the song which will win this year's Eurovision Song Contest".

In a 2010 interview Leskanich would state that Great British Song Contest executive producer Jonathan King had in fact initiated Katrina and the Waves involvement in the Great British Contest as he had contacted Leskanich to ask if her group had a song which might be a suitable contender to vie to become the UK entrant at Eurovision 1997. Leskanich would paraphrase her response to King as being: "Yes, we have this song called 'Love Shine A Light' which we’ve never put on a record because it's too cheesy, too ABBA, too Eurovision, so it would be perfect for you."

Leskanich stated in 2010 that the original plan was that an act other than Katrina and the Waves would be found to perform "Love Shine a Light" for Eurovision consideration but that Warner Bros. Records executive Steve Allan – who  Leskanich describes as "a big Eurovision fan...it’s always been his dream to win it" – said: "Look, you guys have a name, we can still do business in Europe. All you need is a hit song, and we want you to do it. And if you do do it we’ll give you a record deal"; adds Leskanich: "So we couldn’t say no." Leskanich would also state that Kimberley Rew had said of Katrina and the Waves pursuing the Eurovision 1997 title with his composition: "I’m not having anything to do with it". 
The 9 March 1997 broadcast of the Great British Song Contest final featured a taped interview with Rew, in which he described Eurovision as "one of those great institutions of life"; he also accompanied Leskanich onstage to be congratulated for "Love Shine a Light"'s being announced as the UK entrant for Eurovision 1997. However, he didn't perform on stage for this appearance or the Eurovision 1997 final held on 3 May 1997.

In a 2020 interview, Leskanich revealed that she was asked if she could "try and talk like an English person" as some people were not happy with the UK being represented at the Eurovision Song Contest by an American artist.

One of eight songs aired in the Great British Song Contest semi-final broadcast on BBC Radio 2 on 7 February 1997, "Love Shine a Light" was one of four songs advanced by televote to the Great British Song Contest final. The Great British Song Contest final was  a live performance show broadcast by BBC TV on 9 March 1997, at the conclusion of which "Love Shine a Light" was announced as the 1997 UK entrant in Eurovision, the song having received 69,834 televotes – 11,138 more than the second-place finisher.

Critical reception
British magazine Music Week rated "Love Shine a Light" three out of five, writing, "Though perfectly suited for Eurovision with its universal, everyone-come-together message, this anthemic-sounding song will require a decent competition performance to win over record buyers if it is to do anything chartwise."

Eurovision 1997 final

Performance
On the night of the Eurovision 1997 final – held on 3 May 1997 in the Point Theatre, Dublin – "Love Shine a Light" was performed 24th in a field of 25 songs being preceded by the  entry "Probudi me" and followed with the  entry "Minn hinsti dans".

Leskanich would later state she'd supplied her own outfit for her performance on the Eurovision 1997 finale: "the boys [ie. the Waves] were getting beautiful suits made by William Hunt and my outfit was an afterthought. They came [in] with five different designers and every single outfit made me look like a clown or a chair cover...I ended up wearing this green blouse I’d been wearing all week that I’d bought in the Cambridge market for £3 [with] a [dark velvet] jacket that my sister had sent me, which was a Donna Karan second and it only had one shoulder pad. So while I was doing the song, I had to remember to lift my left shoulder slightly to even it out with the other". She also wore black leather trousers and black high-heeled boots.

The Eurovision 1997 finale performance of "Love Shine a Light" was simply staged with Leskanich singing center stage fronting background vocalists Beverley Skeete and Miriam Stockley: Skeete and Stockley, respectively dark-haired and blonde and clad in long dark dresses, also provided accompaniment with tambourines and handclaps. Two of Leskanich's co-members in Katrina and the Waves: drummer, Alex Cooper, and bassist, Vince de la Cruz (on this occasion playing guitar), were positioned towards the right side of the stage, while Phil Nicholl played bass stage left.
Phil Nicholl was not a permanent member of Katrina and the Waves being a substitute for the group's regular guitarist – and the song's composer – Kimberley Rew, who Leskanich would later state had disassociated himself from the group's participating with his song in Eurovision 1997. Don Airey, who played as a session musician on the single recording of the song, arranged and conducted the live version for Katrina & The Waves. He added strings, brass and a vibrato flute, giving the song a more anthemic feel.

Scoring
In a pre-performance interview on the night of the Eurovision 1997 finale Leskanich had stated that Katrina and the Waves winning Eurovision 1997 was "more than a dream – it's probably going to be a reality. I mean we wouldn't come here unless we were intending to win...For Eurovision [success] you need a song with a universal message, lighters in the air, Coca-Cola, heartwarming positive 'all-unite' [message]...[Our] song has a universality about it that unites everyone and I think people are looking for that message in Eurovision...they want something uplifting and positive, and I think once in a while a song comes along that says Eurovision and I think that's what 'Love Shine a Light' says and I'm just lucky that I'm the one that gets to sing it."

The final vote tally for "Love Shine a Light" at Eurovision 1997 set a record unsurpassed until , when the introduction of the semi-final greatly expanded the number of countries voting in the final (indeed, entire top three polled more than 227 points that year). It also received the maximum 12 points from ten countries, a feat not matched until  and not beaten until .

By a more directly comparable measure, "Love Shine a Light" received an average of 9.458 points per country or 78.82% of total votes available, the third-highest in the history of the present voting system, behind only "Save Your Kisses for Me" by Brotherhood of Man in  (9.647 points per jury, 80.39% of available points) and "Ein bißchen Frieden" by Nicole in  (9.470 votes per jury, 78.91% of available points).

Katrina Leskanich commented that it was the second landslide of the week – the Labour Party led by Tony Blair had won the UK general election held two days earlier, on 1 May 1997.

Aftermath
In a 2009 interview Leskanich restated her opinion of "Love Shine a Light": "It was such a feel-good, lighters-in-the-air, cheesy number. It would have been embarrassing for it not to win. It had 'I am a winner' written all over it", while adding: "Our song was quickly forgotten because we didn't have any sensational gimmick like Bucks Fizz". Leskanich also stated that Katrina and the Waves Eurovision victory boosted the group's profile on the European cabaret circuit at the expense of their rock band credibility which heavily factored into the band's 1999 breakup.

Later performances
In 2005, Leskanich co-hosted the Congratulations: 50 Years of the Eurovision Song Contest alongside Renārs Kaupers and sang her winning song in the opening sequence of the show with flag holders of all the nations who ever participated in Eurovision. The commemorative anniversary show was held at the Forum, in Copenhagen on 22 October 2005. The host broadcaster was Danmarks Radio (DR). A remix of her song was performed during the UK selection process final of 2008, Eurovision: Your Decision. In 2009, she performed it with the Dutch SuperVoices made up of 2000 Dutch choir singers.

On 15 December 2019, Leskanich performed the song during Het Grote Songfestivalfeest, a Dutch live television concert programme starring artists of the Eurovision Song Contest as a prelude to the Eurovision Song Contest 2020 that had been scheduled to be held in Rotterdam, the Netherlands in May 2020. Following the 2020 contest's cancellation due to the COVID-19 pandemic, the contest organisers subsequently organised the replacement show Eurovision: Europe Shine a Light, whose title was inspired by the song. The song itself was performed during the show as an orchestral rendition by the Rotterdam Philharmonic Orchestra, and again near the end of the show by all the artists set to take part in the cancelled contest (with the exception of Hooverphonic from Belgium), with Leskanich finishing.

Track listings

 UK CD1
 "Love Shine a Light" (radio version) – 2:52
 "Love Shine a Light" (unplugged version) – 2:51
 "Spiderman" – 3:12

 UK CD2 and Australian CD single
 "Love Shine a Light" (radio version) – 2:51
 "Spiderman" – 3:11
 "Love Shine a Light" (Xenomania club mix) – 7:09

 UK cassette single
 "Love Shine a Light" (radio version) – 2:52
 "Spiderman" – 3:12

 European CD single
 "Love Shine a Light" (radio version) – 2:52
 "Love Shine a Light" (unplugged version) – 2:51

Charts

Weekly charts

Year-end charts

Certifications

Cover versions
 On the 1997 album Ett hus med många rum Kikki Danielssons orkester, featuring Kikki Danielsson on lead vocals, covered the song with lyrics in Swedish by Christer Lundh and Mikael Wendt, as Låt ett ljus få brinna (translated "Let a candle burn").
 In 1997 the German schlager singer Christian Anders published a Single "Liebe und Licht" as a slowed-down version.
 Heidi Kyrö recorded the song in 1998, the Finnish version of the name "Päivänvaloon".
 The song was covered by DJ Mauro Farina in 2002, appearing on Dancemania Speed 9 with the name Love Shine A "Speedy" Light.
 In 2008, Italian Eurodance group Katty B released a Euro House cover that became popular in Italy. It included three acts including an extended version and an instrumental version 
 Danish duo The Olsen Brothers (winners of the 2000 Eurovision Song Contest) recorded a version for their 2010 album Wings of Eurovision.
 South African singer André Huysamen covered the song in Afrikaans as "Liefde skyn 'n lig" for his debut album "ImperfeK(t)". The song also appeared on his second album Elektries, released on 11 September 2013.
  recorded the song as "Liefde brengt licht" for his 2014 album release 12 points which comprised Flemish renderings of Eurovision winners.
 The Irish singer Lee Matthews released it as a charity single on 23 May 2014 with proceeds going to the Irish charity Join Our Boys Trust, a charity for those suffering from Duchenne muscular dystrophy. The single peaked at number 1 in Irish Country Charts and also charted at number 68 in the Irish Pop Charts.
 In 2020, all participants of the cancelled Eurovision Song Contest (except for Belgian representatives Hooverphonic) covered the song for the alternative show called Europe Shine a Light, named after the Eurovision classic.

References

External links
 Song lyrics
 Official fansite
 Official Site
 Official Site for Katrina

1997 songs
1997 singles
Eurovision songs of the United Kingdom
Eurovision songs of 1997
Katrina and the Waves songs
Eurovision Song Contest winning songs
Number-one singles in Israel
Songs written by Kimberley Rew